Two ships of the Royal Navy have borne the name HMS Ivanhoe.

 , a destroyer renamed  whilst still under construction in 1913
 , an  launched 1937, sunk 1 September 1940

Royal Navy ship names